The Bayer designations h Puppis and H Puppis are distinct. They can refer to three stars in the constellation Puppis:
h1 Puppis (NS Puppis), an irregular variable supergiant
h2 Puppis (HD 69142), a K-type giant
H Puppis (HD 53811), an A-type subgiant

Puppis, h
Puppis